Lucas Miedler and Bradley Mousley were the defending champions but were no longer eligible to compete in juniors in 2015.

Jake Delaney and Marc Polmans won the title, defeating Hubert Hurkacz and Alex Molčan in the final, 0–6, 6–2, [10–8].

Seeds

Draw

Finals

Top half

Bottom half

References 

Draw

Boys' Doubles
2015